Short Sharp Shocked is the second album by Michelle Shocked. Originally released in 1988, it was remastered and reissued in 2003 as a two-CD set by Shocked's own label, Mighty Sound. The title is a play on the phrase short, sharp shock. The record title and cover image is similar to that of the 1984 Chaos U.K. album Short Sharp Shock.

The photograph of Shocked that appears on the cover was taken by Chris Hardy of the San Francisco Examiner at a protest in San Francisco during the 1984 Democratic National Convention. The front cover of the 2003 re-issue de-contextualized the original photograph by closely cropping it to Shocked's face, but the back cover features it in full, with the restraining officer's eyes not obscured by airbrushed-on sunglasses like the front cover of the original Mercury release.

Reception

Q magazine's Robert Sandall wrote, "Where this album hits hardest is in the playful unpredictability of [Pete] Anderson and Shocked's arrangements," and observed, "'When I Grow Up' ... introduces a jazzy, acoustic bass shuffle, then starts bouncing miscellaneous sound inserts around beneath the vocal. From here, it's pretty much all stops to the thrash metal finale at the end of side two." Including the album in its best-of-the-year round-up, Q wrote, "Her excellent band revels in every opportunity she gives to cut loose and take chances, which heightens the spontaneous feel of her raggedy vocals. Second albums can often be a disappointment, but this is a firecracker."

Track listing 
All songs written by Michelle Shocked except as noted. The final track is a remake of "Fogtown", originally from The Texas Campfire Tapes, with punk band MDC. It was not listed on the sleeve or disc of the original release, as Shocked "wanted it to surprise people".

Personnel
Michelle Shocked – vocals, acoustic guitar
Pete Anderson – electric guitar, six-string bass guitar on "Hello Hopeville"
Jeff Donavan – drums
Dominic Genova – acoustic bass, electric bass
Skip Edwards – piano, Hammond organ
Michael Tempo – percussion
Al Perkins – dobro
Byron Berline – mandolin
Don Reed – fiddle
Rod Piazza – harmonica
Kristina Olsen – hammered dulcimer
Banjo Jim Croce – banjo
Sophia Ramos – vocals
MDC – vocals on "Fogtown"

Technical personnel
Pete Anderson – arrangements
Peter Doell – engineer (Capitol Studio B)
Leslie Anne Jones – additional Engineering
David Leonard – mixing engineer (Larribee Sound)
Andy Batwinds – second engineer
Bobby Lacivita – second engineer (Sound Castle)
Eddy Schreyer – mastering engineer (Capitol Studios)
Michael Dumds – production assistant

Charts

Album

Singles

References 

Michelle Shocked albums
1988 albums
Mercury Records albums
Albums produced by Pete Anderson
Albums recorded at Capitol Studios